Dakota Lili-Joa Ditcheva (born 11 July 1998) is a British Muay Thai champion. She was part of the British team that won International Federation of Muaythai Amateur World Championships in Jönköping, Sweden. She is three-time world champion and Daily Mirror and Sport England Pride of Sports Young Sportsperson of the Year.

Mixed martial arts record

|-
|
|align=center| 
|Malin Hermansson	
|
|PFL Europe 1
|
|align=center|
|align=center|
|Newcastle, England
|
|-
|Win
|align=center| 7–0
|Katherine Corogenes
|KO (punch)
|PFL 10
|
|align=center|1
|align=center|4:20
|New York City, New York, United States
|
|-
|Win
|align=center| 6–0
|Hassna Gaber
|TKO (submission to knee to the body)
|PFL 9
|
|align=center| 1
|align=center|0:58
|London, England
|
|-
|Win
|align=center|5–0
|Paula Cristina
|Decision (unanimous)
|UAE Warriors 28
|
|align=center|3
|align=center|5:00
|Abu Dhabi, United Arab Emirates
|
|-
|Win
|align=center|4–0
|Simone da Silva		
|TKO (punches)
|PAWFC 1
|
|align=center|2
|align=center|3:43
|Calgary, Canada
|
|-
|Win
|align=center|3–0
|Patricia Borges
|TKO (elbows)
|UK Fighting Championships 17
|
|align=center|1
|align=center|3:58
|Preston, England
|
|-
|Win
|align=center|2–0
|Kerry Isom
|TKO (punches)
|Celtic Gladiator 30
|
|align=center|1
|align=center|4:49
|England
|
|-
|Win
|align=center|1–0
|Jenny Line
|TKO (elbows and knees)
|Caged Steel 25
|
|align=center|1
|align=center|2:04
|Sheffield, England
|

References

External links
 
 Dakota Ditcheva at Awakening Fighters

1998 births
People from Sale, Greater Manchester
English female mixed martial artists
Flyweight mixed martial artists
Bantamweight mixed martial artists
Mixed martial artists utilizing Muay Thai
English Muay Thai practitioners
Female Muay Thai practitioners
Living people